Gerardo Federico Salas Díaz (born 25 May 1975) in Aguascalientes, Aguascalientes is a Mexican politician affiliated with the PAN. He served as Deputy of the Chamber of Deputies during the LXIII Legislature from 1 September 2015 to 31 August 2018.

References

1975 births
Living people
Politicians from Aguascalientes
National Action Party (Mexico) politicians
Members of the Chamber of Deputies (Mexico)
21st-century Mexican politicians
Monterrey Institute of Technology and Higher Education alumni
Panamerican University alumni
People from Aguascalientes City